The Choir Boys with Strings is a studio album by Jeff Kaiser and Andrew Pask with Steuart Liebig and G.E. Stinson, released in 2006 on pfMENTUM (PFMCD037).

Track listing

Personnel 
Clarinet, saxophone, electronics – Andrew Pask
Guitar, electronics – G.E. Stinson, Steuart Liebig
Recorded by Wayne Peet
Trumpet, flugelhorn, electronics, mixed by, mastered by, artwork by – Jeff Kaiser

References 

2006 albums
Avant-garde jazz albums
Folk rock albums